Ricardo Skeete (born 14 September 1952) is a Barbadian cricketer. He played in 25 first-class and 14 List A matches for the Barbados cricket team from 1975 to 1985.

See also
 List of Barbadian representative cricketers

References

External links
 

1952 births
Living people
Barbadian cricketers
Barbados cricketers
People from Saint James, Barbados